The 1989 VMI Keydets football team was an American football team that represented the Virginia Military Institute (VMI) as a member of the Southern Conference (SoCon) during the 1989 NCAA Division I-AA football season. In their first year under head coach Jim Shuck, the team compiled an overall record of 2–8–1, with a mark of 1–4–1 in conference play, tying for sixth place in the SoCon. In January 1989 Shuck was introduced as the 25th all-time head coach of the Keydets after serving as offensive coordinator at Army.

Schedule

References

VMI
VMI Keydets football seasons
VMI Keydets football